Sonja Jayne McIlfatrick  is a nurse and Professor in Nursing and Palliative Care and Dean of Ulster Doctoral College at Ulster University. She was the first non-American President of the International Network of Doctoral Education in Nursing.

Education 
She attended Carrickfergus Grammar School in Northern Ireland. She started her nursing degree in the 1980s, and completed a four year degree at Ulster University. She earned a Bachelor's degree in nursing, which inspired her interest in research. She eventually completed a doctorate in research, where she explored the experiences of patients, caregivers and nurses during day hospital chemotherapy.

Professional life 
McIlfatrick is a Registered Nurse and holds a BSc in nursing (1991) and a MSc in Advanced Nursing (1999) both from from Ulster University where she also earned her PhD (2023) before being appointed to the faculty at Ulster University. She was made Professor in 2013. During her leadership of the All Ireland Institute of Hospice and Palliative Care she established a focussed research network. Her research considers chronic illness and palliative care and she has argued that palliative nursing should be part of education and training. McIlfatrick holds visiting positions in Slovenia and Australia. She is an editorial board member of the Journal of Advanced Nursing the International Journal of Palliative Nursing, Annals of Palliative Medicine and the Journal of Pain and Symptom Management.

Awards and recognition
In 2003 McIlfatrick was awarded the Royal College of Nursing Nurse Researcher of the Year award. She was elected Fellow of the Royal College of Nursing in 2020. She is also a Fellow of the American Academy of Nursing (2020), a Fellow of the Higher Education Academy (2011) and a Fellow of the Royal College of Surgeons in Ireland Faculty of Nursing and Midwifery ad eundem (2007). In 2022 she was awarded the MBE for services to nursing.

Personal life
McIlfatrick has said that she was always interested in working with people in the healthcare sector. She is married to Alan McIlfatrick and they have two sons.

Select publications

References 

Living people
Nurses from Northern Ireland
Alumni of Ulster University
Academics of Ulster University
British women nurses
Fellows of the Royal College of Nursing
Year of birth missing (living people)